Lortalamine (LM-1404) is an antidepressant which was synthesized in the early 1980s. It acts as a potent and highly selective norepinephrine reuptake inhibitor. Lortalamine was under development for clinical use but was shelved, likely due to the finding that it produced ocular toxicity in animals. It has been used to label the norepinephrine transporter in positron emission tomography studies.

See also 
 Norepinephrine reuptake inhibitor

References 

Antidepressants
Norepinephrine reuptake inhibitors
Chloroarenes
Lactams